Ashley Spencer is the name of:

 Ashley Spencer (athlete) (born 1993), American sprinter
 Ashley Spencer (actress), American musical theatre actress